Attila Széki (born 31 August 1989 in Budapest), also known by his stage name Curtis, is a Hungarian singer, rapper, and retired footballer who played as a striker.

Széki comes from Újpest FC's youth team. He was on loan at NB II winning Kecskeméti TE in 2008. He retired in 2012 to focus on his musical career.

Music

He also has a music career under the stage name Curtis.
He commonly worked with Majka.

External links
 Profile 

Living people
1989 births
Hungarian footballers
Association football forwards
Újpest FC players
Kecskeméti TE players
Szolnoki MÁV FC footballers